Sergey Vasilyevich Bakulin (born 13 November 1986 in Insar, Mordvin ASSR) is a male race walker from Russia.

Biography
He was originally the 2011 World Champion in the 50 kilometres race walk before losing his medal for doping infringements. He originally finished in 6th place in the same race in the 2012 Olympics before that result, too, was expunged. He was advanced to 5th place when teammate Igor Yerokhin was disqualified and banned for life following a second finding of irregularities in his biological passport, an indicator of performance-enhancing drugs.

Disqualification
Bakulin began serving a previously unannounced suspension for irregularities in his biological passport beginning in December 2012. Suspicions that he had been suspended began when Bakulin failed to defend his World Championship title on home soil, even though he was given a bye to do so.  Bakulin is coached by Viktor Chegin who has a history of training athletes banned for doping violations.  Bakulin could face additional suspensions as photographs apparently reveal he has competed while serving the original suspension. On 20 January 2015 Bakulin was disqualified for 3 years and 2 months starting from 24 December 2012, and all his results between 25 January 2011 and 25 March 2011, between 16 July 2011 and 16 August 2011, as well as between 11 April 2012 and 11 June 2012 were annulled. On 25 March 2015, the IAAF filed an appeal with the Court of Arbitration in Lausanne, Switzerland, questioning the selective suspension periods of the six athletes involved including the window that opened up less than a month before his World Championship gold medal. On 24 March 2016, his results from 25 February 2011 to 24 December 2012 were disqualified. He received a second doping ban in August 2019, banning him for 8 years up to April 2027 with all of his results from 20 May 2018 to 3 April 2019 disqualified.

International competitions

References

External links

1986 births
Living people
People from Insar
Sportspeople from Mordovia
Sportspeople from Samara, Russia
Russian male racewalkers
Olympic male racewalkers
Olympic athletes of Russia
Athletes (track and field) at the 2012 Summer Olympics
Universiade gold medalists for Russia
Universiade gold medalists in athletics (track and field)
Medalists at the 2009 Summer Universiade
World Athletics Championships medalists
World Athletics Championships athletes for Russia
Athletes stripped of World Athletics Championships medals
European Athletics Championships medalists
Russian Athletics Championships winners
Doping cases in athletics
Russian sportspeople in doping cases